The 2018 Central Michigan Chippewas football team represented Central Michigan University in the 2018 NCAA Division I FBS football season. They were led by fourth-year head coach John Bonamego and played their home games at Kelly/Shorts Stadium as members of the West Division of the Mid-American Conference. They finished the season 1–11, 0–8 in MAC play to finish in last place in the West Division.

On November 23, following a loss to Toledo, head coach John Bonamego was fired. He finished at Central Michigan with a four-year record of 22–29. On December 2, the school hired Michigan wide receivers coach Jim McElwain, who previously served as head coach at Colorado State and Florida.

Previous season
The Chippewas finished the 2017 season 8–5, 6–2 in MAC play to finish in a tie for second place in the West Division. They received an invitation to the Famous Idaho Potato Bowl where they lost to Wyoming.

Preseason

Award watch lists
Listed in the order that they were released

Preseason media poll
The MAC released their preseason media poll on July 24, 2018, with the Chippewas predicted to finish in fifth place in the West Division.

Schedule

Game summaries

at Kentucky

Kansas

at Northern Illinois

Maine

at Michigan State

Buffalo

Ball State

Western Michigan

at Akron

at Eastern Michigan

Bowling Green

Toledo

Players drafted into the NFL

References

Central Michigan
Central Michigan Chippewas football seasons
Central Michigan Chippewas football